The Mauser M 98 are a series of currently (2020) produced bolt-action hunting rifles.
The production of the controlled round feed Mauser 98 bolt action system for the German military ceased at the end of World War II in 1945. The new Mauser M 98 and M 98 Magnum rifles for civil users are in production since 1999 in Isny im Allgäu, Germany by Mauser Jagdwaffen GmbH (Mauser Hunting Weapons Ltd.), according to original drawings of 1936 and the respective Mauser patents. Mauser Jagdwaffen GmbH is a subsidiary of SIG Sauer.

The Mauser M 98 series rifles are practically a civilian version of the Karabiner 98k, which was one of the final developments in the long line of Mauser 98 military rifles of World War I and World War II.
Vaguely similar to the latter rifle in appearance, the M 98 is offered in many different hunting chamberings, not like the original service rifle.

Design details
As a modern civilian offspring of the Karabiner 98k service rifle, the new Mauser M 98 series offers several features and factory options, that are also typical for sporterised Mauser Karabiner 98k ex-service rifles, ranging from various technical departures from the basic Mauser service rifle it was based on to luxury wood grades, gold inlays, engravings and surface treatments like plasma-based nitriding to protect metal parts against corrosion in aggressive environmental conditions or color case hardening. Some of the available options were originally developed and introduced by John Rigby & Co. on Rigby Mauser hunting rifles.

Operating mechanism
The M 98 controlled round feed bolt action system is a simple, strong, safe, and well-thought-out design that was originally patented by Paul Mauser on 9 September 1895 and inspired other military and hunting/sporting rifle designs that became available during the 20th and 21st century. A drawback of the M 98 system is that it can not be cheaply mass-produced very easily. Some other bolt action designs (e.g. the Lee–Enfield) may offer trained operators a faster rate of fire depending on the model used. The basic Mauser M 98 version retails (2009) for approximately EUR 6,800, but the addition of (luxury) options can make these rifles much more expensive. For the Mauser M 98 series the M 98 bolt action system is machined out of one solid piece of high-grade steel. It also features a double square bridge for mounting a telescopic sight.

Features

The M 98 system consists of a receiver that serves as the systems shroud and a bolt group of which the bolt body has three locking lugs, two large main lugs at the bolt head and a third safety lug at the rear of the bolt which serves as a backup in case the primary locking lugs failed. This third lug is a distinctive feature and was not present on previous Mauser bolt action designs. The two main locking lugs display a locking surface of 56 mm², whilst the third safety lug normally plays no part in locking the action to avoid asymmetric and hence unbalanced bolt thrust forces. The diameter of the receiver was also enlarged compared to previous Mauser receivers for additional strength and safety. The bolt handle is permanently attached to the bolt and on the Mauser M 98 series is turned-down for use with optical sights.

Another distinctive feature of the M 98 system is the controlled round feed mechanism, consisting of a large, non-rotating claw extractor that engages the cartridge case rim as soon as the round leaves the magazine and firmly holds the cartridge case until the round is ejected by the ejector, mounted inside the receiver. Combined with a slight bolt retraction at the last stage of the bolt opening cycle, caused by the cammed surface on the rear receiver bridge, this results in a positive cartridge case extraction. The M 98 bolt action will cycle correctly irrespective of the way the rifle is moved or positioned during the bolt cycling action or if the cartridge has been fired or not. Only if the bolt is not brought back far enough, sharply enough, in a controlled round feed bolt action the cartridge case may not be cleanly ejected and a jam may result.

The bolt houses the firing pin mechanism that gets cocked when the bolt is opened and the cocking piece protrudes visually and tactilely from the rear of the bolt to indicate the action is cocked. This bolt sleeve lock was not present on previous Mauser bolt action designs and reduced firing pin travel and lock time.

The action features large gas relief holes and a gas shield on the bolt sleeve designed to protect the users head in case of a primer or cartridge rupture or detonation. When the action suffers a catastrophic failure it is designed to deflect the debris away from the operator's face.

The Mauser M 98 bolt mechanism can be easily removed from the receiver simply by pulling out the bolt stop, located at the left wall of the receiver, and then by rotating and pulling the bolt out.

Safety
As standard the Mauser M 98 rifle features the traditional Mauser 98 three-position safety attached at the rear of the bolt which operating lever can be flicked from right (safety on, bolt locked) to middle (safety on, bolt can be opened for reloading), to left (ready to fire) but only when the rifle is cocked, otherwise the safety will not move. The safety secures the firing pin. The safety can only be released by firing the rifle with the safety set in the ready to fire position or by closing the cocked bolt with a previously pulled trigger that must be kept pulled back during the closing operation. Disengaging the safety by closing the bolt is only possible with the safety set in the ready to fire position. The safety catch lever is quite large, making it easy to operate but posing a problem for mounting telescopic sights very low above the receiver whilst retaining good operability of the safety catch leaver.
The Mauser M 98 rifle series can also be ordered with an optional Mauser horizontal 3-position safety with locking lever to ensure good operability of the safety catch leaver with low mounted aiming optics.

Barrel
The standard barrel length is 600 mm (23.62 in) for the M 98 and 620 mm (24.41 in) for the M 98 Magnum variant.
Other barrel lengths are available upon request for the M 98 and M 98 Magnum variant, subject to availability.
As an option the rifles can be ordered with an integral barrel. This is a barrel with a quarter rib, sight bases and a sling swivel mounting machined out of a solid barrel blank.

Ammunition feeding
The internal magazine of the M 98 system consists of an integral box machined to match the cartridge for which the rifle was being chambered, with a detachable floorplate, that can hold up to 5 standard sized rifle cartridges. The magazine can be loaded with single rounds by pushing the cartridges into the receiver top opening. The magazine can be unloaded by operating the bolt (the safety should for safety reasons be set to the middle position for this) or in case of mechanical problems by opening the magazine floorplate.
The Mauser M 98 internal magazine has a 5+1 magazine capacity in standard calibers and 4+1 in magnum calibers.

Sights
An express iron sight line with one standing and two folding leaves zeroed for 50, 100 and 150 meters are standard. A Rigby-style diopter sight is also available. The M 98 rifle system is factory prepared for swing-off telescopic sight mounts (bases in square bridge).

Stock
The standard hand-rubbed oil-finished walnut wood stock has a straight comb with Rigby-style cheekpiece, a rubber recoil pad, steel pistol grip cap and ebony forend tip. These stocks come in quality walnut wood grade 5 and higher wood grades are also available. Besides these options further customizing options like Rigby-style peep sight, and engraving on action and floorplate are also available.

Chamberings
The Mauser M 98 Standard is available in 7×57mm Mauser, .308 Winchester, .30-06 Springfield, 8×57 IS, and 9.3×62mm.

Variants
The Mauser M 98 Magnum is a currently (2019) produced magnum variant of the modern M 98 line intended for big-game safari hunting.
This Magnum variant exploits the fact that throughout the design's history, standard and enlarged versions of the Mauser M 98 system have been produced for the civil market. John Rigby & Co. commissioned Mauser to develop the M 98 magnum action over a hundred years ago. It was designed to function with the large sized cartridges normally used to hunt Big Five game and other dangerous game species. For this specialized type of hunting, where absolute reliability of the rifle under adverse conditions is very important, the controlled-feed M 98 system remains the standard by which other action designs are judged.

The currently (2019) produced Mauser M 98 Magnum rifles are offered in .375 Holland & Holland Magnum with a 5+1 magazine capacity, .416 Rigby, and .450 Rigby with a 4+1 magazine capacity.

References

Bolt-action rifles
Rifles of Germany
Hunting rifles
Mauser rifles